Rich Taylor may refer to:

 Richard E. Taylor (1929–2018), Canadian physicist
 Rich Taylor (politician) (born 1954), Iowa state senator